Lee Hye-young (born November 25, 1962) is a South Korean actress. She is the daughter of celebrated film director Lee Man-hee, who died in 1975 when she was in middle school. Lee began her acting career in 1981 at the age of 17 through a local musical theatre production of The Sound of Music. Since then she has performed in theater, feature and short films, and television. She was one of the most prominent South Korean actresses in the 1980s, starring in films such as The Blazing Sun (1985), Winter Wanderer (1986), Ticket (1986), The Age of Success (1988), North Korean Partisan in South Korea (1990), Fly High Run Far (1991), Passage to Buddha (1993), and No Blood No Tears (2002).  Lee also played supporting roles in the Korean dramas I'm Sorry, I Love You (2004), Fashion 70's (2005) and Boys Over Flowers (2009).

Filmography

Film
 Walk Up (2022) 
 Anchor (2022) – So-jeong 
 The Novelist's Film (2022)
 A Year-End Medley (2021) 
In Front of Your Face  (2021)
The Devil's Game  (2008)
Low Life (2004)
No Blood No Tears (2002) 
The Hair Dresser (1995)
Sudden Change (1994)
Passage to Buddha (1993)
Myong-ja Akiko Sonia (1992)
Blood and Fire (1991)
Fly High Run Far (1991)
Winter Dreams Do Not Fly (1991)
North Korean Partisan in South Korea (1990)
Korean Connection (1990)
The Second Sex (1989)
The Age of Success (1988)
A Dangerous Scent (1988)
Sa Bangji (1988)
The Home of Two Women (1987)
Flower Blooms Even on a Windy Day (1987)
The Street Musician  (1987) 
Field of Honor (1986)
Ticket (1986) 
Queen Bee (1986)
Winter Wanderer (1986) 
The Blazing Sun (1985)
Between the Knees (1984)
Mrs. Kim Ma-ri (1983)
My Mother's Wedding Ceremony (1981)

Television series
Kill Heel (2022)
Lawless Lawyer (2018)
Mother (2018)
Listen to My Heart (2011) 
Boys Over Flowers (2009) 
Look Back With a Smile (2006)
Fashion 70's (2005) 
I'm Sorry, I Love You (2004)
And So Flows History (1989–1990)

Web series 
 Big Bet (2022)

Theater
 Medea (2017)
Hedda Gabler (2012)
Jesus Christ Superstar (2000)
Hamlet (1999)
The Queen of Tears (1998)
Yeonsan, a Problematic Figure  (1995)
House (1994)
Betrayal (1992) 
Antony and Cleopatra (1992)
Hymn of Death (1988)
Romeo 20 (1986)
Snow White
Padam Padam Padam
Past (Josin) Peter
Evita
The Fantasticks
Cabaret
The Silence of My Beloved
The Sound of Music (1981)

Awards
 2023 Director's Cut Awards : Best Actress in Television - nom (Big Bet ) 
 2022 International Cinephile Society : Best Actress - won (In Front of Your Face)  
2022 58th Grand Bell Awards: Best Actress - nom (In Front of Your Face)    
 2022 23rd Busan Film Critics Awards : Best Actress - won (In Front of Your Face)  
 2022 31st Buil Film Awards; Best Actress nom (In Front of Your Face)  
 2022 Chunsa Film Art Awards 2022  Best Actress; nom (In Front of Your Face) 
 2022 Wildflower Film Awards; Best Actress; (In Front of Your Face) nom 
 2022 19th International Cinephile Society Awards; Best Actress; (In Front of Your Face)
2022 58th Baeksang Arts Awards: Best Actress (In Front of Your Face)
2013 49th Dong-A Theatre Awards: Best Actress (Hedda Gabler)
2012 5th  Korea Theater Awards: Best Actress (Hedda Gabler)
1996 32nd Dong-A Theatre Awards: Best Actress (Yeonsan, a Problematic Figure)
1995 31st Baeksang Arts Awards: Best Actress in Theater (House)
1992 13th Blue Dragon Film Awards: Best Supporting Actress (Myong-ja Akiko Sonia)
1992 30th Grand Bell Awards: Best Supporting Actress (Myong-ja Akiko Sonia)
1989 25th Baeksang Arts Awards: Best Actress (The Age of Success)
1988 25th Dong-A Theatre Awards: Best Actress (Hymn of Death)
1988 24th Baeksang Arts Awards: Most Popular Actress in Film (The Street Musician)
1987 11th Seoul Theater Festival: Best Actress (Romeo 20)
1986 22nd Baeksang Arts Awards: Best New Actress (Queen Bee)
1986 25th Grand Bell Awards: Best Supporting Actress (Winter Wanderer)

References

External links

South Korean film actresses
South Korean television actresses
South Korean stage actresses
South Korean musical theatre actresses
Chung-Ang University alumni
1962 births
Living people
Best Actress Paeksang Arts Award (film) winners